Hisako "Chako" Higuchi (born 13 October 1945 in Kawagoe, Saitama) is a Japanese professional golfer.

Higuchi won the LPGA Championship on 12 June 1977, making her the first Asian-born player to win a major championship for either men or women. (No Asian-born player would win a men's major until Yang Yong-eun won the 2009 PGA Championship.) Alongside Ayako Okamoto, she dominated the 1970s and 1980s in Japanese women's golf.

Higuchi studied golf from Torakichi Nakamura, a member of Japan's winning team at the 1957 World Cup of Golf. She turned pro in 1967 and went on to win 69 titles on the LPGA of Japan Tour. She was 31 when she won her LPGA Championship.

Higuchi became President of the LPGA of Japan Tour in 1996. In 2003, she became the first Japanese golfer to be inducted into the World Golf Hall of Fame.

Professional wins

LPGA of Japan Tour (69)
1968 (2) Japan Women's Open, Japan LPGA Championship
1969 (2) Japan Women's Open, Japan LPGA Championship
1970 (3) Japan Women's Open, Japan LPGA Championship, JGP Ladies Open
1971 (4) Japan Women's Open, Japan LPGA Championship, JGP Ladies Open, Tokai Classic
1972 (5) Japan LPGA Championship, JPGA Asahi Kokusai Tournament, JGP Ladies Open, Tokai Classic, Mizuno Golf
1973 (7) Japan LPGA Championship, World Ladies, JGP Ladies Open, La Coste Cup Japan vs. U.S., Matsushima Ladies Open, Tokai Classic, Mizuno Golf
1974 (8) Japan Women's Open, Japan LPGA Championship, World Ladies, LPGA Japan Classic, Chikuma Kogen Ladies Open, Tokyo Charity Classic, Sunster Ladies Match, Mizuno Golf
1975 (1) Tokai Classic
1976 (5) Japan Women's Open, Japan LPGA Championship, Sanpo Champions, Miyagi TV Cup Ladies Open Golf Tournament, Tokai Classic
1977 (3) Japan Women's Open, Japan LPGA Championship, Tokai Classic
1978 (3) Junon Ladies Open, Shinkoh Classic LPGA Tournament, Japan LPGA East vs. West
1979 (5) Fuji Heigen Ladies Open, Shinkoh Classic LPGA Tournament, Japan LPGA East vs. West, Hokuriku Queens Golf Cup, Toyotomi Ladies
1980 (3) Japan Women's Open, KBS Kyoto Ladies Golf Tournament, Tokai Classic
1981 (3) Okinawa Makiminato Auto Ladies Tournament, Tokushima Tsukinomiya Ladies Open Golf Tournament, Pioneer Cup
1982 (2) Hokuriku Queens Golf Cup, Kumamoto Chuou Ladies Cup Golf Tournament
1983 (5) Kibun Ladies Classic, Paris Ladies Classic, Japan LPGA East vs. West, LPGA Japan vs. U.S., Daioh Seishi Elleair Ladies Open Golf Tournament
1984 (2) Kumamoto Chuou Ladies Cup Golf Tournament, Kibun Ladies Classic
1985 (1) Chukyo TV-Bridgestone Ladies Open
1986 (2) Fujitsu Ladies, Tsumura-Itsuki Classic
1987 (1) Yamaha Cup Ladies Open
1990 (2) an Queens, Kohsaido Asahi Golf Cup

LPGA Tour (2)

LPGA Tour playoff record (0–1)

ALPG Tour (1)
1974 Wills Australian Ladies Open

Other (1)
1983 Sports Nippon Team Match

Major championships

Wins (1)

References

External links 

Chako Higuchi bio at golfcompendium.com

Japanese female golfers
LPGA of Japan Tour golfers
LPGA Tour golfers
Winners of LPGA major golf championships
World Golf Hall of Fame inductees
People from Kawagoe, Saitama
Sportspeople from Saitama Prefecture
1945 births
Living people
20th-century Japanese women